Adrian Mannarino defeated Laslo Đere in the final, 7–6(7–1), 6–4 to win the singles tennis title at the 2022 Winston-Salem Open. Mannarino saved four match points en route to the title, in his first-round match against Christopher O'Connell.

Ilya Ivashka was the defending champion, but lost in the third round to Marc-Andrea Hüsler.

Seeds
All seeds receive a bye into the second round.

Draw

Finals

Top half

Section 1

Section 2

Bottom half

Section 3

Section 4

Qualifying

Seeds

Qualifiers

Lucky losers

Qualifying draw

First qualifier

Second qualifier

Third qualifier

Fourth qualifier

References

External links
Main draw
Qualifying draw

Winston-Salem Open - Singles
2022 Singles